Major General Sir Claude Francis Liardet,  (26 September 1881 – 5 March 1966) was an insurance broker, businessman and a long-serving artillery officer in Britain's part-time Territorial Army before becoming the first Commandant General of the RAF Regiment.

Early life
Claude Liardet was born on 26 September 1881, the son of Commander Henry Maughan Liardet of Her Majesty's Indian Navy. He was educated at Bedford School.

Military career
Liardet was commissioned into the part-time 1st Lancashire Volunteer Artillery in Liverpool on 21 June 1899. The unit became the Lancashire and Cheshire Royal Garrison Artillery when the Territorial Force (TF) was formed in 1908 and Liardet served in the World War I, during which he was mentioned in despatches four times and awarded the Distinguished Service Order. In 1919 he became Commanding Officer (CO) of his unit, which became the Lancashire & Cheshire Coast Brigade, RGA when the TF was converted into the Territorial Army (TA) in 1921. He transferred as CO to the 106th (Lancashire Yeomanry) Brigade, Royal Field Artillery in 1923.

In 1929 Liardet became CO of 64th (7th London) Field Brigade, Royal Artillery, serving in 47th (2nd London) Division and in 1934 he was promoted to Commander Royal Artillery (CRA) of that division. When the 47th Division was disbanded in 1936 he transferred as CRA to the combined London) Division (later the 56th (London) Infantry Division). Liardet was promoted to command the 56th Division in the rank of major general in 1938 – a rare honour for a TA officer – and held that post during the early part of World War II.

In 1941 Liardet was appointed Inspector General of Aerodrome Defence and Director General of Ground Defence at the Air Ministry. In 1942 he became Commandant-General of the RAF Regiment until the end of the war, when he retired.

He was appointed Honorary Colonel of the 64th (7th London) Field Brigade, RA, on 16 October 1937.

Business career
Liardet was a director of the Lloyd's of London insurance brokers Bevington, Vaizey, and Foster Ltd.

Family life
Liardet married on 11 January 1906 to Dorothy Hopper, they had a son Henry and a daughter, Dorothy Marie. He remarried on 25 May 1928 to Dorothy Clare Borrett and they had a son. Liardet died in 1966.

Notes

References
 Burke's Peerage, Baronetage and Knightage, 100th Edn, London, 1953.

External links
British Army Officers 1939−1945
Generals of World War II

|-

|-

|-

1881 births
People educated at Bedford School
British Army personnel of World War I
British Army generals of World War II
Royal Artillery officers
Royal Air Force Regiment officers
Knights Commander of the Order of the British Empire
Companions of the Order of the Bath
Companions of the Distinguished Service Order
1966 deaths
British Army major generals
Military personnel from Liverpool